Patrick Le Hyaric (born 4 February 1957 in Orléans, Loiret) is a French journalist, politician and Member of the European Parliament (MEP), elected in the 2009 European election for the Île-de-France constituency. He is the director of the newspaper L'Humanité since 2000, when he replaced Pierre Zarka.

Le Hyaric is a member of the executive of the French Communist Party and also the federal secretary of the Communist federation in the Morbihan. In 2004, he led the PCF list in the West constituency. The PCF list obtained 4.1% in the constituency, but no MEPs were elected.

In 2009, he was selected to lead the Left Front list in the Île-de-France constituency ahead of the 2009 European elections. His list won 6.32% of the vote, and he was elected to the European Parliament.

References

1957 births
Living people
French Communist Party MEPs
MEPs for Île-de-France 2009–2014
MEPs for Île-de-France 2014–2019
Writers from Orléans
French Communist Party politicians
French journalists
Politicians from Orléans